Reginald Wayne Bibby  (born 1943) is a Canadian sociologist. He has held the Board of Governors Research Chair in the Department of Sociology at the University of Lethbridge since 2001.

Born on 3 April 1943 in Edmonton, Alberta, he received a Bachelor of Arts degree from the University of Alberta, a BD from the Southern Baptist Theological Seminary, a Master of Arts degree from the University of Calgary, and a PhD from Washington State University.

In 2006, he was appointed an Officer of the Order of Canada.

Selected bibliography
 The Emerging Generation: An Inside Look at Canada's Teenagers. Co-authored with Don Posterski (1985)
 Fragmented Gods: The Poverty and Potential of Religion in Canada (1987)
 Mosaic Madness: The Poverty and Potential of Life in Canada (1990)
 Teen Trends: A Nation in Motion. Co-authored with Don Posterski (1992)
 Unknown Gods: The Ongoing Story of Religion in Canada (1993)
 The Bibby Report: Social Trends Canadian Style (1995)
 There's Got to Be More! Connecting Churches & Canadians (1995)
 Canada's Teens: Today, Yesterday, and Tomorrow (2001)
 Restless Gods: The Renaissance of Religion in Canada (2002)
 Restless Churches: How Canada's Churches Can Contribute to the Emerging Religious Renaissance (2004)
 The Boomer Factor: What Canada's Most Famous Generation Is Leaving Behind (2006)
 The Emerging Millennials: How Canada's Newest Generation Is Responding to Change & Choice (2009)
 Beyond the Gods and Back: The Demise and Rise of Religion in Canada (2011)
 A New Day: The Resilience & Restructuring of Religion in Canada (2012)
 Canada's Catholics: Vitality and Hope in a New Era. Co-Authored with Angus Reid (2016)
 Resilient Gods: Being Pro-Religious, Low Religious, or No Religious in Canada (2017)

References

External links
 

Living people
Canadian sociologists
Canadian non-fiction writers
Officers of the Order of Canada
Sociologists of religion
Southern Baptist Theological Seminary alumni
University of Alberta alumni
University of Calgary alumni
Academic staff of the University of Lethbridge
Washington State University alumni
Writers from Edmonton
1943 births